Rava may refer to:

Biographical
 Bishnu Prasad Rabha, multifaceted artist and revolutionary singer of Assam
 Abba ben Joseph bar Ḥama (born 280), a Jewish Talmudist who lived in Babylonia, always known by the honorific name Raba, Rava, or Amora-Rava
 Rava (surname)

Culinary
 Another name for the wine grape Ravat blanc
 Rava, also Suji, an Indian term for semolina; used in making Bombay rava, Rava dosa, etc.

Geographical
 Rava (island), an island in the Croatian part of the Adriatic sea
 Rava-Ruska, a city in the Lviv Oblast of western Ukraine
 Rava, the Hungarian name for Roua village, Fântânele Commune, Mureș County, Romania
 Rava, Harju County, village in Kõue Parish, Harju County, Estonia 
 Rava, Järva County, village in Ambla Parish, Järva County, Estonia

Sociocultural

hr:Rava